Larry Brown (born June 16, 1949) is an American former professional footall player who was a tight end and offensive tackle with the Pittsburgh Steelers of the National Football League (NFL). He played college football for the Kansas Jayhawks, and played on the 1968 Orange Bowl squad with future Pro Football Hall of Fame running back John Riggins and pro quarterback Bobby Douglass.

Brown played as a tight end from 1971–1976, and as a tackle from 1977-1984. During that time, he was one of 22 players to play in all of the first four of the Steelers Super Bowl victories (Super Bowl IX, Super Bowl X, Super Bowl XIII, and Super Bowl XIV). Brown scored a touchdown late in the 4th quarter of Super Bowl IX against the Minnesota Vikings.

1949 births
Living people
American football tight ends
American football offensive tackles
Kansas Jayhawks football players
Pittsburgh Steelers players
Players of American football from Jacksonville, Florida